Philippe Le Guay (born 22 October 1956) is a French screenwriter, film director and occasional actor. He studied film at the IDHEC and began his career as a screenwriter before directing his first feature film Les Deux Fragonard in 1989. He is known for his work on The Women on the 6th Floor (2010), which was well received at the French box office, and the César Award-nominated Bicycling with Molière (2013).

Filmography

As director/screenwriter

As actor

References

External links
 

Living people
1956 births
Film directors from Paris
French male screenwriters
French screenwriters
French male film actors